Schutzbar genannt Milchling is an Upper Hesse, latterly baronial noble family. The earlier Hessian branch of the family is still a member of the knighthood.

History
Wolfgang Schutzbar, joined the Teutonic Order in 1507 and was from 1529 to 1543 Komtur of the Bailiwick of Hesse at Marburg.

Coat of arms
Blazon: "2:1 In Silver, three escutcheons with trefoil stems related to black lime leaves (or balls or hearts). On the helmet a sign of two bird wings. “The mantlings are in black and silver."

References
Rüdiger Bier: 1500 Jahre Geschichte und Geschichten der herrschaftlichen Sitze zu Kirchscheidungen und Burgscheidungen, Eigenverlag Rittergut Kirchscheidungen 2009
Thomas Weyrauch:  Die Entwicklung der Stadt Gießen und ihrer Umgebung unter Hauptmann Caspar von Schutzbar. In: Mitteilungen des Oberhessischen Geschichtsvereins Giessen. Neue Folge Band 73 (1987), S. 63 – 83
Thomas Weyrauch: Das Grabdenkmal des Ritters Caspar von Schutzbar in der Kirche zu Treis an der Lumda. Treis (Kirchengemeinde Treis an der Lumda)  1988

See also
Anne-Marie von Schutzbar gennant Milchling

German noble families